Aliartos is a small town and municipality in the Boeotia regional unit, Greece, at 109 kilometres from Athens. The 2011 census recorded 10,887 residents in the municipality, 6,094 residents in the municipal unit and 4,847 in the community of Aliartos.  Its name comes from the ancient city of Haliartus.

Geography
Aliartos lies in the center of the Kopais (Kωπαΐδα) plain.

Climate
Under the Köppen climate classification, Aliartos has a hot-summer Mediterranean climate (Csa), with wet, cool winters and dry, hot summers.

History 
The modern town of Aliartos is a recent creation. In the early 19th century, the site was occupied by two small agricultural settlements, Moulki (Μούλκι) and Krimpas (Κριμπάς). In 1835, the name of ancient Haliartus was revived for the newly established municipality which encompassed these settlements. Krimpas was renamed to Aliartos in June 1919, but in 1951 the settlement was disbanded and the name was transferred in July 1953 to Moulki. The names of Moulki and Krimpas survive as quarters of the new town.

Municipality
The municipality Aliartos was formed at the 2011 local government reform by the merger of the following two former municipalities, that became municipal units:
Aliartos
Thespies

See also
 Tower of Aliartos
 List of settlements in Boeotia

References

Municipalities of Central Greece
Populated places in Boeotia